The 1873 Columbia football team represented Columbia University in the 1873 college football season.

Schedule

References

Columbia
Columbia Lions football seasons
Columbia football